9Y or 9-Y may refer to:

9 years
9Y, IATA airline code for Air Kazakhstan, which went bankrupt in 2004
9Y, international code identifying airplanes from the state of Trinidad and Tobago
Salmson 9Y, a model of Salmson 9
USP9Y, or Ubiquitin specific peptidase 9, Y-linked
9Y, Aircraft registration for  Trinidad and Tobago

See also
Y9 (disambiguation)